Alive at the Fucker Club is a live album by Melvins, which was released in 1998 through Amphetamine Reptile Records. Recorded live August 23, 1997, at the Corner Hotel in Richmond, Melbourne, Australia. The Melvins opened for the Cosmic Psychos in Richmond on August 22, August 23 and 24.

The length of the first four tracks doesn't match the songs: "Boris" is 0:00 (track 1) to 5:00 (track 1), "It's Shoved" is 5:00 (track 1) to 2:10 (track 2), "Bar-X-The Rocking M" is 2:10 (track 2) to 1:26 (track 3), "Smoke on the Water (Jam)" is 1:26 (track 3) to 1:48 (track 3) and "Antitoxidote" is 1:48 (track 3) to the end of track 4. The jam of Deep Purple's "Smoke on the Water" is uncredited.

Track listing

Personnel
Buzz Osborne –  guitar, vocals
Dale Crover – drums, vocals
Mark Deutrom – bass, vocals

References

Melvins live albums
1998 live albums
Amphetamine Reptile Records live albums